A jump process is a type of stochastic process that has discrete movements, called jumps, with random arrival times, rather than continuous movement, typically modelled as a simple or compound Poisson process.

In finance, various stochastic models are used to model the price movements of financial instruments; for example the Black–Scholes model for pricing options assumes that the underlying instrument follows a traditional diffusion process, with continuous, random movements at all scales, no matter how small. John Carrington Cox and Stephen Ross proposed that prices actually follow a 'jump process'.

Robert C. Merton extended this approach to a hybrid model known as jump diffusion, which states that the prices have large jumps interspersed with small continuous movements.

See also
Poisson process, an example of a jump process
Continuous-time Markov chain (CTMC), an example of a jump process and a generalization of the Poisson process
Counting process, an example of a jump process and a generalization of the Poisson process in a different direction than that of CTMCs
Interacting particle system, an example of a jump process
Kolmogorov equations (continuous-time Markov chains)

References

Stochastic processes